Opinion polling on the presidency of Emmanuel Macron has been regularly conducted by French pollsters since the start of his five–year term. Public opinion on various issues has also been tracked.

Political barometers 
The table below lists "political barometers" published by various polling organisations, which monitor the evolution of public opinion on the President of France, Prime Minister of France, as well as notable political personalities. IFOP–Fiducial publishes two polls each month: one on the popularity of the executive and the second on various political personalities, including Emmanuel Macron and the Prime Minister. Only the first is listed in the table below.

Though the composition of panels of respondents of every pollster are determined by the quota method as defined by the Institut national de la statistique et des études économiques (INSEE), differences in methodology between each political barometer result in significant different results between pollsters. These differences range from the sample size, method of collecting respondents (with Kantar Sofres using face–to–face interviews, IFOP using phone interviews and BVA recruiting its panel by phone) and significant differences in question wording. According to Frédéric Dabi, director of the IFOP, the difference between the two political barometers produced by his institute–one conducted for Le Journal du Dimanche, the other for Paris Match and Sud Radio–is that the latter asks about the "action" of the executive, and is therefore a more "short–termist" political question, and as a result is significantly more volatile than the other survey.

Graphical summary

Emmanuel Macron

Macron and Borne

Macron and Castex

Macron and Philippe

See also 
2020 French municipal elections
2022 French legislative election
2022 French presidential election
Opinion polling for the 2019 European Parliament election in France
Opinion polling for the 2022 French legislative election
Opinion polling for the 2022 French presidential election

Notes

References

External links 
Notices of the French polling commission 
President Emmanuel Macron's approval rating–Politico Europe

Emmanuel Macron
Opinion polling in France